Sir John Desmond Patrick Keegan  (15 May 1934 – 2 August 2012) was an English military historian, lecturer, author and journalist. He wrote many published works on the nature of combat between prehistory and the 21st century, covering land, air, maritime, intelligence warfare and the psychology of battle.

Life and career
Keegan was born in Clapham to an Irish World War One veteran and was evacuated to Somerset when World War Two broke out. At the age of 13, Keegan contracted orthopaedic tuberculosis, which subsequently affected his gait. The long-term effects of this rendered him unfit for military service, and the timing of his birth made him too young for service in the Second World War, facts he mentioned in his works as an ironic observation on his profession and interests. The illness also interrupted his education in his teenage years, although it included a period at King's College, Taunton and two years at Wimbledon College, which led to entry to Balliol College, Oxford in 1953, where he read history with an emphasis on war theory. After graduation he worked at the American Embassy in London for three years.

In 1960 Keegan took up a lectureship in military history at the Royal Military Academy Sandhurst, which trains officers for the British Army. He remained there for 26 years, becoming a senior lecturer in military history during his tenure, during which he also held a visiting professorship at Princeton University and was Delmas Distinguished Professor of History at Vassar College.

Leaving the academy in 1986, Keegan joined the Daily Telegraph as a defence correspondent and stayed with the paper as defence editor until his death. He also wrote for the conservative American publication National Review Online. In 1998, he wrote and presented the BBC's Reith Lectures, entitling them War in our World.

Keegan died on 2 August 2012 of natural causes at his home in Kilmington, Wiltshire.  He was survived by his wife, their two daughters and two sons.

Published work
In A History of Warfare, Keegan outlined the development and limitations of warfare from prehistory to the modern era. It looked at various topics, including the use of horses, logistics, and "fire". A key concept put forward was that war is inherently cultural. In the introduction, he vigorously denounced the idiom "war is a continuation of policy by other means", rejecting "Clausewitzian" ideas. However, Keegan's discussion of Clausewitz was criticised as uninformed and inaccurate by writers like Peter Paret, Christopher Bassford, and Richard M. Swain.

Other books written by Keegan are: The Iraq War, Intelligence in War, The First World War, The Second World War, The Battle for History, The Face of Battle, War and Our World, The Mask of Command, and Fields of Battle. 

He also contributed to work on historiography in modern conflict. With Richard Holmes he wrote the BBC documentary Soldiers: A History of Men in Battle. Frank C. Mahncke wrote that Keegan is seen as "among the most prominent and widely read military historians of the late twentieth century". In a book-cover blurb extracted from a more complex article, Sir Michael Howard wrote, "at once the most readable and the most original of living historians".

Views on contemporary conflicts
Keegan stated: "I will never oppose the Vietnam War. Americans were right to do it. I think they fought it in the wrong way. I don't think it's a war like fighting Hitler, but I think it was a right war, a correct war."
Keegan believed that NATO's bombing of Serbia and Serbian targets in Kosovo in 1999 showed that air power alone could win wars.
An article in The Christian Science Monitor called Keegan a "staunch supporter" of the Iraq War. It quotes him:  "Uncomfortable as the 'spectacle of raw military force' is, he concludes that the Iraq war represents 'a better guide to what needs to be done to secure the safety of our world than any amount of law-making or treaty-writing can offer.'"

Criticism
Keegan was also criticised by peers, including Sir Michael Howard and Christopher Bassford for his critical position on Carl von Clausewitz, a Prussian officer and author of Vom Kriege (On War), one of the basic texts on warfare and military strategy. Describing Keegan as "profoundly mistaken", Bassford stated, "Nothing anywhere in Keegan's work – despite his many diatribes about Clausewitz and 'the Clausewitzians' – reflects any reading whatsoever of Clausewitz's own writings." The political scientist Richard Betts criticised Keegan's understanding of the political dimensions of war, calling Keegan "a naïf about politics."

In his 1997 book Revolutionary Armies in the Modern Era: A Revisionist Approach (described as "too flawed to be recommended as an undergraduate text"), historian S.P. MacKenzie reports Keegan as saying that the best panzer units of the Waffen SS altered the course of the war and were "faithful unto death and fiercer in combat than any soldiers who fought them on western battlefields".

Detlef Siebert, a television documentarian, disagreed with Keegan's view that the deliberate targeting of civilian populations by aerial bombing 'descended to the enemy's level', although he did call it a 'moral blemish'.

Honours
On 29 June 1991, as a war correspondent for The Daily Telegraph, Keegan was appointed Officer of the Order of the British Empire (OBE) "in recognition of service within the operations in the Gulf". In the 2000 New Year Honours, he was knighted "for services to Military History".

He was elected a Fellow of the Royal Society of Literature (FRSL) in 1986. In 1993 he won the Duff Cooper Prize.

In 1996, he was awarded the Samuel Eliot Morison Prize for lifetime achievement by the Society for Military History.

The University of Bath awarded him an Honorary Doctor of Letters (DLitt)  in 2002.

Works
 
Waffen SS: the asphalt soldiers (New York: Ballantine, 1970) 
Barbarossa: Invasion of Russia, 1941 (New York, 1971) 
Opening Moves – August 1914 (New York: Ballantine, 1971) 
Guderian (New York: Ballantine, 1973) 
Rundstedt (New York: Ballantine, 1974) 
Dien Bien Phu (New York: Ballantine, 1974) 
The Face of Battle (London, 1976) 
Who Was Who in World War II (1978) 
The Nature of War with Joseph Darracott (New York: Holt, Rinehart and Winston, 1981) 
Six Armies in Normandy (1982) 
Zones of Conflict: An Atlas Of Future Wars with Andrew Wheatcroft (New York, 1986) 
Soldiers: A History of Men in Battle with Richard Holmes (New York: Viking Press, 1986) 
The Mask of Command (London, 1987) 
The Price of Admiralty (1988) 
The Illustrated Face of Battle (New York and London: Viking, 1988) 
The Second World War (Viking Press, 1989) 
Churchill's Generals (Weidenfeld & Nicolson, 1991) editor
A History of Warfare (London, 1993) 
The Battle for History: Refighting World War Two (Vintage Canada, 1995) 
Warpaths (Pimlico, 1996) 
Fields of Battle: The Wars for North America (1997) 
War and Our World: The Reith Lectures 1998 (London: Pimlico, 1999) 
The Book of War (ed.) (Viking Press, 1999) 
The First World War (London: Hutchinson, 1998) ; (New York: Knopf, 1999) 
An Illustrated History of the First World War (Alfred A. Knopf, 2001) 
Winston Churchill (2002) 
Intelligence in War: Knowledge of the Enemy from Napoleon to Al-Qaeda (2003)  (also published with alternative subtitle as Intelligence in War: The value – and limitations – of what the military can learn about the enemy )
The Iraq War (2004) 
Atlas of World War II (ed.) (London: Collins, 2006)  (an update of the 1989 Times Atlas)
The American Civil War (London, Hutchinson, 2009)

Notes

References
Bassford, Christopher. "John Keegan and the Grand Tradition of Trashing Clausewitz." War in History, November 1994, pp. 319–36
 

Snowman, Daniel. "John Keegan", pp. 28–30 from History Today, Volume 50, Issue # 5, May 2000

External links

In Depth interview with Keegan, 2 November 2003
Interview with History Today

1934 births
2012 deaths
People from Clapham
People educated at Wimbledon College
Alumni of Balliol College, Oxford
British people of Irish descent
British Roman Catholics
British military writers
British male journalists
Knights Bachelor
Officers of the Order of the British Empire
British military historians
Fellows of the Royal Society of Literature
People educated at King's College, Taunton
Historians of World War I
Historians of World War II
20th-century British writers
21st-century British writers
20th-century British historians
21st-century British historians
Academics of the Royal Military Academy Sandhurst